Elizabeth E. Wein (born October 2, 1964) is an American-born writer best known for her young adult historical fiction. She holds both American and British citizenship.

Personal life 
Elizabeth E. Wein was born in New York City on October 2, 1964. She moved to England when she was three. When she was six, her father, Norman Wein, was sent to the University of the West Indies in Jamaica, where she lived from 1970 to 1973. As a child, she was fluent in Jamaican patois.

Wein moved back to the United States when her parents separated, and she was raised by her mother Carol Flocken in Harrisburg, Pennsylvania until her death in a car accident in 1978, after which Wein lived with her maternal grandparents. She wrote her first novel at age 11. Wein attended Yale University and, after a year of work-study in England, spent seven years getting a PhD in Folklore at the University of Pennsylvania. Wein moved to England with her English husband Tim in 1995 and settled in Scotland in 2000. She and Tim have two children.

Wein has a passion for planes, and she possesses a private pilot licence which she received in 2003.

Writing career
Wein's first five books recount a version of the King Arthur stories which moves the narrative to the kingdom of Aksum in 6th century Ethiopia. The stories focus on her interpretation of Medraut (Mordred) and his half-Aksumite, half-British son Telemakos.

Her 2012 novel, Code Name Verity, is a World War II thriller focusing on the friendship between an English women, and a Scottish women,
 a transport pilot and a spy. It received critical acclaim; it was awarded an Edgar Award for Best Young Adult Novel and designated a Michael L. Printz Award Honor book in 2013. A follow-up novel, Rose Under Fire, also set in World War II, tells the story of an Air Transport Auxiliary pilot who is captured and sent to the Ravensbrück concentration camp.

Wein's short stories have been published in collections edited by Ellen Datlow, Terri Windling, and Sharyn November. She is a regular reviewer for the New York Times Book Review.

Works

Novels
Black Dove, White Raven  (Disney-Hyperion, February 2015)
Star Wars: The Last Jedi: Cobalt Squadron (Disney-Lucasfilm Press, 2017)
Firebird (Barrington Stoke, 2018)
White Eagles (Barrington Stoke, 2019)

Code Name Verity world
Code Name Verity (Egmont UK, 2012; Disney-Hyperion, 2012, ; Doubleday Canada, 2012)
Rose Under Fire (Egmont UK, June 2013; Disney-Hyperion, September 2013, ; Doubleday Canada, September 2013)
The Pearl Thief (Disney-Hyperion, May 2017)
The Enigma Game (Bloomsbury Children's (UK), May 2020)

The Lion Hunters: the Arthurian/Aksumite Cycle
 The Winter Prince (Atheneum, 1993; reissued by Firebird Books, 2003)
 A Coalition of Lions (Viking, 2003)
 The Sunbird (Viking, 2004)
 The Mark of Solomon 1: The Lion Hunter (Viking, 2007)
 The Mark of Solomon 2: The Empty Kingdom (Viking, 2008)

Short stories
"Change of Heart." In From a Certain Point of View (Star Wars). Ed. Elizabeth Schaefer. New York: Del Rey, 2017.
"The Color of the Sky." In A Tyranny of Petticoats. Ed. Jessica Spotswood. Somerville, MA: Candlewick Press, 2016.
"The Battle of Elphinloan." In Taking Aim. Ed. Michael Cart. New York: HarperTeen, 2015.
"For the Briar Rose."  In Queen Victoria's Book of Spells.  Ed. Ellen Datlow and Terri Windling.  New York: Tor, 2013.
“Something Worth Doing.”  In Firebirds Soaring.  Ed. Sharyn November.  New York: Firebird Books, 2009.
“Always the Same Story.”  In The Coyote Road: Trickster Tales.  Ed. Ellen Datlow and Terri Windling.  New York: Viking, 2007.
“Chain of Events.”  In Rush Hour: Reckless.  Ed. Michael Cart.  New York: Delacorte Books for Young Readers, June 2006.
“Chasing the Wind.”  In Firebirds.  Ed. Sharyn November.  New York: Firebird Books, 2003.
“A Dear Gazelle.”  In Marion Zimmer Bradley's Fantasy Magazine Issue 47 (2000), pp. 34–38.
“The Ethiopian Knight.” In Odyssey:  A Magazine of Science Fiction and Fantasy Issue 7 (1998), pp. 42–46.
“No Human Hands to Touch.”  In Sirens and Other Daemon Lovers.  Ed. Ellen Datlow and Terri Windling.  New York:  HarperPrism, 1998; reprinted New York: Eos, 2002.
“The Bellcaster’s Apprentice.”  In The Horns of Elfland.  Ed. Ellen Kushner, Delia Sherman, and Donald G. Keller.  New York:  Roc/Penguin USA, 1997.
“New Year’s Eve.”  In Not the Only One.  Ed. Tony Grima.  Boston: Alyson Press, 1995.
“Fire.”  In Writers of the Future.  Vol. IX.  Ed. Dave Wolverton.  Los Angeles:  Bridge Publications, 1993.

Nonfiction
A Thousand Sisters: The Heroic Airwomen of the Soviet Union in World War II (Balzer + Bray, 2019)

References

External links

 
 
 

Living people
21st-century American novelists
21st-century American short story writers
21st-century American women writers
American children's writers
American emigrants to Scotland
American fantasy writers
American historical novelists
American women children's writers
American women novelists
American women short story writers
Edgar Award winners
21st-century Scottish novelists
21st-century Scottish women writers
Scottish children's writers
Women historical novelists
Women science fiction and fantasy writers
Writers of modern Arthurian fiction
1964 births